Ak-Bulak is a village in the Issyk-Kul Region of Kyrgyzstan. It is part of the Tüp District. Its population was 1,184 in 2021. Until 2012 it was an urban-type settlement.

Population

References

Populated places in Issyk-Kul Region